Francesco Maria Nocchieri, born in Ancona, was a seventeenth-century Italian sculptor of minor reputation active in Rome, where he spent time in the large studio of Bernini. He worked largely as a restorer of antiquities. He was among the many Roman sculptors patronised by Christina, Queen of Sweden in her retirement in Rome; for Christina he executed an Apollo (1680) to complement a set of Roman sculptures of Muses that had been found at Hadrian's Villa, which were doubtless restored by Nocchieri; the Apollo is now at La Granja de San Ildefonso. The largest collection of Nocchieri's sculptures today are in the Gardens of Aranjuez, Madrid.
A terracotta bozzetto at the Ashmolean Museum represents Apollo holding his lyre, attentive to the Muses.

Some other sculptors in Rome renowned for their restorations
Carlo Albacini
Orfeo Boselli
Ippolito Buzzi
Bartolomeo Cavaceppi
Ercole Ferrata
Francesco Fontana
Giovanni Battista Piranesi
Vincenzo Pacetti

Notes

17th-century Italian sculptors
Italian male sculptors
Year of birth missing
Year of death missing